The Chief of Staff of the Italian Air Force refers to the Chiefs of Staffs of the Royal Italian Air Force from 1926 to 1946 and the Italian Air Force from 1946 to the present.

List of chiefs of staff

Kingdom of Italy

Italian Republic

See also
Italian Armed Forces
Chief of the Defence Staff (Italy)
Royal Italian Air Force
Italian Air Force

Notes

References

External links

Aeronautica Militare chiefs of staff
Italian Air Force
Lists of Italian military personnel
Italy